All Saints Episcopal Church is a historic church in Winter Park, Florida, United States. It is located at 338 E Lyman Avenue. On January 7, 2000, it was added to the U.S. National Register of Historic Places. It includes Late Gothic Revival architecture designed by Ralph Adams Cram and by H.C. Cone.

History 
In 1886, an Episcopalian church was built on the land. By 1937, instead of renovating the current building, the congregation wanted to construct a new, larger building. The church hired architectural firm Cram and Ferguson to design it. With World War II on the horizon, the church pushed to start the new church's construction in 1941. On March 29, 1942, the first worship service in the new church was held by Reverend Paul Matthews. Stained glass windows were installed in the church between 1946 and 1947 by the Willet Stained Glass Studio.

Rectors

(1945–1950) James L. Duncan, later suffragan bishop of the Episcopal Diocese of South Florida and first bishop of the Episcopal Diocese of Southeast Florida.

The current Rector is Stuart Shelby.

References

External links
 Church website
 All Saints Episcopal Church at Florida's Office of Cultural and Historical Programs

Episcopal church buildings in Florida
National Register of Historic Places in Orange County, Florida
Churches on the National Register of Historic Places in Florida
Buildings and structures in Winter Park, Florida
Gothic Revival church buildings in Florida
Ralph Adams Cram church buildings
Churches in Orange County, Florida
1941 establishments in Florida
Churches completed in 1941